Djalmabatista is a genus of midges in the family Chironomidae. There are about 14 described species in Djalmabatista.

Species
These 14 species belong to the genus Djalmabatista:

 Djalmabatista amancii Fittkau, 1968
 Djalmabatista antonii Fittkau, 1968
 Djalmabatista dellomei Fittkau, 1968
 Djalmabatista director Fittkau, 1968
 Djalmabatista ivanyae Fittkau, 1968
 Djalmabatista lacustris Paggi, 1985
 Djalmabatista maillardi Doitteau & Nel, 2007
 Djalmabatista orlandoi Oliveira & Carraro, 1997
 Djalmabatista patamona
 Djalmabatista pulcher (Johannsen, 1908)
 Djalmabatista pulchra (Johannsen, 1908)
 Djalmabatista sinica Liu & Tang, 2017
 Djalmabatista travassosi Carraro, Oliveira & Rego, 1992
 Djalmabatista wapixana

References

Further reading

 
 

Tanypodinae
Articles created by Qbugbot